Patterson station may refer to:
Patterson station (Metro-North), a railway station serving Patterson, New York
Patterson station (SkyTrain), a rapid transit station in Metro Vancouver, British Columbia
Patterson railway station, in Melbourne, Victoria

See also
 Paterson railway station (disambiguation)